Singles Box Set 1981–1985 is a box set by English new wave band Duran Duran. Consisting of 13 CDs, it was released on 12 May 2003 by EMI and covers the era from Duran Duran (1981) to Arena (1984), as well as the non-studio album single "A View to a Kill" (1985).

Each CD is supposed to be a faithful copy of the UK vinyl single as it was released in the early 1980s, with all of the B-sides and alternate tracks, and each is packaged in a square cardboard sleeve replicating the original artwork. The 13 cardboard sleeves are then packaged in a heavy-duty card box.

This marked the first time many of these tracks, including B-sides and alternate versions, appeared on CD.

There is at least one song missing from this collection:
 The initial version of the UK 7 inch "Rio" single (EMI5346) featured the version of the song known as "Rio (Single version)".  Later versions of this single replaced the A-side with "Rio (Part 1)".  The version of the song included in this collection is "Rio (Part 1)".

Additionally, because this collection is based on the regular UK single releases, there are a number of songs which appeared on international releases, but were excluded from the collection:
 "To the Shore", the US b-side to "Planet Earth".  This track is available elsewhere on CD, but so are many other tracks included in this collection.
 "Girls on Film (Night Version)". There is an alternate mix that lasts 5:45 and features slightly different instrumentation. There's also an instrumental Night Version that was released on a Greek 12".
 "My Own Way (Instrumental version)". This instrumental version of the night version appeared on the UK Promo 12 inch single and is a digital bonus track for the 2CD special edition of Rio.
 "New Religion (live)", the US b-side to "The Reflex".

The set was reissued on 19 October 2009 as a 3CD jewel cased edition. CD1 contains the tracks from the "Planet Earth", "Careless Memories", "Girls on Film", "My Own Way" and "Hungry Like the Wolf". CD2 the tracks from "Save A Prayer", "Rio", "Is There Something I Should Know?" and "Union of the Snake" and CD3 the tracks from "New Moon on Monday", "The Reflex", "The Wild Boys" and "A View to a Kill".

Track listing
The boxset comprises the following CD singles:

 CD 1: "Planet Earth" (1981)
 "Planet Earth" – 4:03
 "Late Bar" – 2:57
 "Planet Earth" (Night Version) – 6:18
 CD 2: "Careless Memories" (1981)
 "Careless Memories" – 3:44
 "Khanada" – 3:28
 "Fame" – 3:17
 CD 3: "Girls on Film" (1981)
 "Girls on Film" – 3:30
 "Faster Than Light" – 4:28
 "Girls on Film" (Night Version) – 5:29
 CD 4: "My Own Way" (1981)
 "My Own Way" (Single Version) – 3:42
 "Like An Angel" – 4:47
 "My Own Way" (Night Version) – 6:36
 CD 5: "Hungry Like the Wolf" (1982)
 "Hungry Like the Wolf" – 3:31
 "Careless Memories" (Live Version) – 4:12
 "Hungry Like the Wolf" (Night Version) – 5:11
 CD 6: "Save A Prayer" (1982)
 "Save A Prayer" (7" Edit) – 5:28
 "Hold Back The Rain" (Re-Mix) – 4:01
 "Hold Back The Rain" (12" Re-Mix) – 7:06
 CD 7: "Rio" (1982)
 "Rio" (Part One) – 5:15
 "The Chauffeur" (Blue Silver) – 3:50
 "Rio" (Part Two) – 5:31
 "My Own Way" [Carnival remix] – 4:37

 CD 8: "Is There Something I Should Know?" (1983)
 "Is There Something I Should Know?" – 4:10
 "Faith in This Colour" – 4:09
 "Is There Something I Should Know?" (Monster Mix) – 6:44
 "Faith in This Colour" (Alternate Slow Mix) – 4:06
 CD 9: "Union of the Snake" (1983)
 "Union of the Snake" – 4:24
 "Secret Oktober" – 2:47
 "Union of the Snake" (The Monkey Mix) – 6:27
 CD 10: "New Moon on Monday" (1984)
 "New Moon on Monday" (Album Version) – 4:18
 "Tiger Tiger" – 3:30
 "New Moon on Monday" (Dance Mix) – 6:03
 CD 11: "The Reflex" (1984)
 "The Reflex" – 4:26
 "Make Me Smile (Come Up And See Me)" (Recorded Live at Hammersmith Odeon) – 4:58
 "The Reflex" – 6:34
 CD 12: "The Wild Boys" (1984)
 "The Wild Boys" – 4:18
 "(I'm Looking For) Cracks in the Pavement" ([Live] 1984) – 4:10
 "The Wild Boys" (Wilder Than Wild Boys) Extended Mix – 8:00
 CD 13: "A View to a Kill" (1985)
 "A View to a Kill" – 3:37
 "A View to a Kill" (That Fatal Kiss) – 2:31

3-CD edition
 CD 1 ("Planet Earth" to "Hungry Like the Wolf")

 "Planet Earth" – 4:30
 "Late Bar" – 2:57
 "Planet Earth" (Night Version) – 6:18
 "Careless Memories" – 3:44
 "Khanada" – 3:28
 "Fame" – 3:17
 "Girls on Film" – 3:30
 "Faster Than Light" – 4;28
 "Girls on Film" (Night Version) – 5:29
 "My Own Way" (Single Version) – 3:42
 "Like An Angel" – 4:47
 "My Own Way" (Night Version) – 6:36
 "Hungry Like the Wolf" – 3:31
 "Careless Memories" (Live Version) – 4:12
 "Hungry Like the Wolf" (Night Version) – 5:11

 CD 2 ("Save a Prayer" to "Union of the Snake")
 "Save a Prayer" (7" Edit) – 5:28
 "Hold Back The Rain" (Re-Mix) – 4:01
 "Hold Back The Rain" (12" Re-Mix) – 7:06
 "Rio" (Part One) – 5:15
 "The Chauffeur" (Blue Silver) – 3:50
 "Rio" (Part Two) – 5:31
 "My Own Way" [Carnival remix] – 4:37
 "Is There Something I Should Know?" – 4:10
 "Faith in This Colour" – 4:09
 "Is There Something I Should Know?" (Monster Mix) – 6:44
 "Faith in This Colour" (Alternate Slow Mix) – 4:06
 "Union of the Snake" – 4:24
 "Secret Oktober" – 2:47
 "Union of the Snake" (The Monkey Mix) – 6:27

 CD 3 ("New Moon on Monday" to "A View to a Kill") 
 "New Moon on Monday" (Album Version) – 4:18
 "Tiger Tiger" – 3:30
 "New Moon on Monday" (Dance Mix) – 6:03
 "The Reflex" – 4:26
 "Make Me Smile (Come Up And See Me)" (Recorded Live at Hammersmith Odeon) – 4:58
 "The Reflex" (Dance Mix) – 6:34
 "The Wild Boys" – 4:18
 "(I'm Looking For) Cracks in the Pavement" ([Live] 1984) – 4:10
 "The Wild Boys" (Wilder Than Wild Boys) Extended Mix – 8:00
 "A View to a Kill" – 3:37
 "A View to a Kill" (That Fatal Kiss) – 2:31

Charts

Certifications

References

2003 compilation albums
Duran Duran compilation albums
EMI Records compilation albums